Jolie is a monthly German fashion magazine published in Munich, Germany.

History and profile
Jolie was first published on 30 September 2003. The magazine is part of  Axel Springer SE and is published on a monthly basis by Vision Media. The headquarters of the monthly is in Munich. Anja Müller-Lochner is the editor-in-chief.

In 2010 Jolie had a total circulation of 375,642 copies.

References

External links
 Official website

2003 establishments in Germany
German-language magazines
Magazines established in 2003
Magazines published in Munich
Monthly magazines published in Germany
Women's fashion magazines
Women's magazines published in Germany